Mielagėnai is a town in Ignalina district municipality, in Utena County, southern Lithuania. According to the 2011 census, the town has a population of 236 people. There is John the Baptist church, build at 1790.

Famous citizens
Augustinas Janutėnas, the book smuggler.

References

Towns in Utena County
Towns in Lithuania
Sventsyansky Uyezd
Wilno Voivodeship (1926–1939)
Ignalina District Municipality